The  (Mass for troubled times), commonly known as the Nelson Mass (Hob. XXII/11), is a Mass setting by the Austrian composer Joseph Haydn. It is one of the six masses written near the end of his life that are seen as a culmination of Haydn's composition of liturgical music.

Background
Haydn's chief biographer, H. C. Robbins Landon, has written that this mass "is arguably Haydn's greatest single composition". Written in 1798, it is one of the six late masses by  Haydn for the Esterhazy family composed after taking a short hiatus, during which elaborate church music was inhibited by the Josephinian reforms of the 1780s. The late sacred works of Haydn are regarded as masterworks, influenced by the experience of his London symphonies. They highlight the soloists and chorus while allowing the orchestra to play a prominent role. Owing to the political and financial instability of this period in European history, Haydn's patron Nikolaus II dismissed the Feldharmonie, or wind band octet, shortly before Haydn wrote the Missa in angustiis for the Princess's name day. Haydn, therefore, was left with a "dark" orchestra composed of strings, trumpets, timpani, and organ. Later editors and arrangers added what they perceived to be missing woodwind parts, but the original scoring has again become the accepted choice for modern performances.

Though Haydn's reputation was at its peak in 1798, when he wrote this mass, his world was in turmoil. Napoleon had won four major battles with Austria in less than a year. The previous year, in early 1797, his armies had crossed the Alps and threatened Vienna itself. In May 1798, Napoleon invaded Egypt to destroy Britain's trade routes to the East.

The summer of 1798 was therefore a terrifying time for Austria, and when Haydn finished this mass, his own title, in the catalogue of his works, was Missa in angustiis (Mass for troubled times). What Haydn did not know when he wrote the mass, but what he and his audience heard (perhaps on September 15, the day of the very first performance), was that on 1 August, Napoleon had been dealt a stunning defeat in the Battle of the Nile by British forces led by Admiral Horatio Nelson. Because of this coincidence, the mass gradually acquired the nickname Lord Nelson Mass. The title became indelible when, in 1800, Lord Nelson himself visited the Palais Esterházy, accompanied by his British mistress, Lady Hamilton, and may have heard the mass performed by Haydn himself and would meet shortly afterwards.

Haydn's original title may also have come from illness and exhaustion at this time, which followed his supervision of the first performances of The Creation, completed a few months earlier. More simply, it may have sprung from the challenge of composing without the desired instrumentation. The solo parts for two of the vocal quartet are virtuosic: the bass line was perhaps written for the accomplished Christian Specht, and the soprano line, even more demanding, could have been written for Barbara Pilhofer or Therese Gassmann. The piece was premiered 23 September 1798 at the town parish church (now cathedral), a last minute venue change from the Bergkirche in Eisenstadt.

Movements
The text, slightly altered, is taken from the Latin Mass of the Catholic church. It consists of the following six movements.Performances require between 45 and 60 minutes. The choir sings in all movements.

Selected discography
 1962: King's College Choir and a reduced London Symphony Orchestra with Sylvia Stahlman (soprano), Helen Watts (contralto), Wilfred Brown (tenor), Tom Krause (baritone), Simon Preston (organ), conducted by Sir David Willcocks; recording re-released in 2000 by London/Decca Legends CD 458623
 1986: The English Concert Choir and the English Concert conducted by Trevor Pinnock, recording released in 1990 by Archiv Produktion (Deutsche Grammophon) CD 423097

References
Notes

Sources
 Hibbert, Christopher (1994). Nelson – A Personal History. Basic Books. .
 
 McCaldin, Denis (1995). "Haydn's 'Nelson' Mass: Its decline and rise." South African Journal of Musicology/Suid-Afrikaanse tydskrif vir musiekwetenskap (SAMUS), 15: 25–32.
 Webster, James and Feder, Georg. "§ Sacred vocal music" in "Haydn, Joseph." Grove Music Online. Oxford Music Online.

Further reading
 Schenbeck, Lawrence. (1985) "Missa in angustiis by Joseph Haydn." Choral Journal, 25, no. 9: 19, 25–30.

External links
 
 
 UC Davis Symphony & Chorus: Haydn: Missa in angustiis (Lord Nelson Mass)

Masses by Joseph Haydn
1798 compositions
Horatio Nelson